2019 census may refer to:

2019 Alberta municipal censuses
Belarus Census (2019)